James Addison Baker III (born 1930) is an American attorney, statesman, and political figure. 

James A. Baker may also refer to:

 James A. Baker (born 1821) (1821–1897), American jurist and politician; often called "Judge Baker"
 James A. Baker (born 1857) (1857–1941), American attorney often called "Captain Baker"
 James A. Baker Jr. (1892–1973), American attorney
 James A. Baker (born 1821) (1821–1897), American jurist and politician in Texas
 James A. Baker (justice) (1931–2008), American jurist who served on the Texas Supreme Court from 1995 to 2003
 James A. Baker (government attorney) (fl. 1980s–2010s), American Department of Justice official; Counsel for Intelligence Policy
 James A. Baker (trade unionist) (before 1875 – after 1903), Canadian miner and trade unionist

See also
James Addison Baker (disambiguation)
James Baker (disambiguation)